This is a list of events that took place in the year 1992 in Azerbaijan.

Incumbents 
 President: 
 until 6 March: Ayaz Mutallibov 
 6 March-4 May: Yagub Mammadov (acting)
 4 May-18 May: Ayaz Mutallibov
 19 May-16 June: Isa Gambar
 starting 16 June: Abulfaz Elchibey
 Prime Minister: 
 until 4 April: Hasan Hasanov
 4 April-14 May: Firuz Mustafayev (acting)
 starting 14 May: Rahim Huseynov

January

February

March

April

May

June

September

References